The Dead Don't Die may refer to:

 The Dead Don't Die (1975 film), a neo-noir horror thriller
 The Dead Don't Die (2019 film), a zombie horror-comedy

See also
 Dead Men Don't Die, a 1991 horror comedy